The Smith-Pettit Foundation is an American non-profit, 501(c)(3) research organization based in Salt Lake City, Utah. The foundation was founded in the year 2000. The foundation "supports scholarly research and publication". It is also the majority owner of Signature Books.

Management 
George D. Smith is the founder, president, and treasurer of the Smith-Pettit Foundation.

Gary J. Bergera is the Vice President, Secretary, and managing director of the Smith-Pettit Foundation.

David P. Wright, Professor Emeritus of Bible and the Ancient Near East at Brandeis University, is on the Smith-Pettit's Foundation board as Director.

Ronald L. Priddis, Gary J. Bergera's former writing partner, is also a director at the foundation.

Associations 

Since 2005 the Smith-Pettit Foundation has sponsored an AML Award through the Association for Mormon Letters for "Outstanding Contribution to Mormon Letters". Past winners of the award include Margaret Blair Young, Orson Scott Card, and Melissa Leilani Larson.

The Smith-Pettit Foundation sponsors an annual lecture through Sunstone Magazine.

References

Research organizations in the United States
Mormon studies
Organizations based in Salt Lake City